Polystira antillarum is a species of sea snail, a marine gastropod mollusk in the family Turridae, the turrids.

Description
(Description of Pleurotoma virgo) The shell is ridged and striated, the central ridge forming a carina. The shell is usually glossy white, but when covered by its epidermis corneous.

Distribution
This marine species occurs in the West Indies (Guadeloupe).

References

 J. A. Todd and K. G. Johnson. 2013. Dissecting a marine snail species radiation (Conoidea: Turridae: Polystira) over 12 million years in the southwestern Caribbean. Bulletin of Marine Science 89(4)

External links
  Todd J.A. & Rawlings T.A. (2014). A review of the Polystira clade — the Neotropic's largest marine gastropod radiation (Neogastropoda: Conoidea: Turridae sensu stricto). Zootaxa. 3884(5): 445-491.

antillarum
Gastropods described in 1865